Peter Morgan (born 1963) is a British screenwriter and dramatist.

Peter Morgan may also refer to:
 Peter G. Morgan (politician) (1817–1890), African-American shoemaker and politician in Virginia
 Peter Morgan (automaker) (1919–2003), British sports car manufacturer
 Peter Morgan (sport shooter) (1927–2009), British Olympic shooter
 Pete Morgan (1939–2010), British poet, author and presenter
 Peter Morgan (footballer) (born 1951), Welsh footballer
 Peter Morgan (rugby union) (born 1959), Wales and British Lions rugby union international
 P. G. Morgan, British TV producer and writer
 Peter Morgan (producer), American film producer known for American Sniper and Identity Thief
 Peter Morgan (cricketer) (born 1972), South African cricketer

See also
 Morgan (surname)